Francis Owen may refer to:

 Francis Owen (missionary) (1802–1854), English missionary
 Francis Owen (politician) (1745–1774), British politician
 Francis Owen (philologist) (1886–1975), Canadian philologist and military officer